Shinohara Station (篠原駅) is the name of two train stations in Japan:

 Shinohara Station (Kōchi)
 Shinohara Station (Shiga)